Veronika Kudermetova and Anastasia Pavlyuchenkova defeated reigning champion Giuliana Olmos and partner Gabriela Dabrowski in the final, 1–6, 6–4, [10–7] to win the women's doubles tennis title at the 2022 Italian Open.

Sharon Fichman and Olmos were the defending champions, but Fichman could not defend her title due to injury.

Seeds

Draw

Finals

Top half

Bottom half

Seeded teams
The following are the seeded teams, based on WTA rankings as of April 25, 2022.

Other entry information

Wildcards

Protected ranking
  Kaitlyn Christian /  Han Xinyun

Alternates
  Madison Brengle /  Arina Rodionova

Withdrawals
Before the tournament
  Irina-Camelia Begu /  Shelby Rogers → replaced by  Nadiia Kichenok /  Shelby Rogers 
  Lyudmyla Kichenok /  Jeļena Ostapenko → replaced by  Ekaterina Alexandrova /  Anna Danilina
  Nadiia Kichenok /  Raluca Olaru → replaced by  Kirsten Flipkens /  Sara Sorribes Tormo
  Veronika Kudermetova /  Elise Mertens → replaced by  Marta Kostyuk /  Elena-Gabriela Ruse
  Tereza Martincová /  Aliaksandra Sasnovich → replaced by  Madison Brengle /  Arina Rodionova

References

External links
Main draw

Doubles women
Italian Open - Doubles